Mistake of the Heart (German: Irrtum des Herzens) is a 1939 German romantic drama film directed by Bernd Hofmann and Alfred Stöger and starring Paul Hartmann, Leny Marenbach and Hans Söhnker.  It was shot at the Bavaria Studios in Munich. The film's sets were designed by the art directors Robert A. Dietrich and Artur Günther. It was produced and distributed by Bavaria Film, premiering at the Gloria-Palast in Berlin.

Cast
 Paul Hartmann as Professor Reimers
 Leny Marenbach as Angelika
 Hans Söhnker as 	Flugkapitän van Santen
 Käthe Dorsch as Oberin 
 Grethe Weiser as 	Therese
 Karl Ludwig Schreiber as 	Konrad Reimers
 Walter Janssen as 	Dr. Erwin Büttner
 Alice Treff as 	Erika Büttner
 Karl Etlinger as 	Dr. Leitgerber
 Albert Florath as 	Steinmeyer
 Josefine Dora as 	Nikolaus
 Werner Pledath as 	Dr. Eickstädt
 Wilhelm Bendow as 	Straaßenbahnschaffner
 Wolf Ackva as 	Dr. Smolny 
 Reinhold Bernt as	Dr. Reithofer 
 Arthur Fritz Eugens as Helmuth 
 Willi Schur as Kantinenwirt 
 Ewald Wenck asKutscher

References

Bibliography 
 Giesen, Rolf. The Nosferatu Story: The Seminal Horror Film, Its Predecessors and Its Enduring Legacy. McFarland, 2019.
 Klaus, Ulrich J. Deutsche Tonfilme: Jahrgang 1939. Klaus-Archiv, 1988.
 Rentschler, Eric. The Ministry of Illusion: Nazi Cinema and Its Afterlife. Harvard University Press, 1996.

External links 
 

1939 films
Films of Nazi Germany
German drama films
1939 drama films
1930s German-language films
Films directed by Alfred Stöger
Bavaria Film films
1930s German films
Films shot at Bavaria Studios